Allomorone is an extinct genus of prehistoric bony fish which has not been assigned to any class.  Species lived from 40 to 23mya (Late Eocene - Late Oligocene).

Alepisauriformes includes the following species:
A. burlesonis (Dante & Frizzel, 1965) - Texas, Late Eocene
A. varians (Polkowsky, 1994) - Germany, Late Oligocene

References

 paleodb

Prehistoric perciform genera